Madicken på Junibacken is a 1980 Swedish film about the Astrid Lindgren character Madicken, directed by Göran Graffman.

Cast
 Jonna Liljendahl as Margareta "Madicken" Engström
 Liv Alsterlund as Lisabet
 Monica Nordquist as Kajsa
 Björn Granath as Jonas
 Lis Nilheim as Alva
 Birgitta Andersson as Emma Nilsson
 Allan Edwall as Emil P. Nilsson
 Sebastian Håkansson as Abbe Nilsson
 Kerstin Hansson as Mia

External links
 
 

1980 films
Films based on works by Astrid Lindgren
Swedish children's films
1980s Swedish-language films
1980s Swedish films